Nanulik was a territorial electoral district (riding) for the Legislative Assembly of Nunavut, Canada.

The riding consisted of the communities of Coral Harbour and Chesterfield Inlet. Coral Harbour is now a part of the Aivilik riding and Chesterfield Inlet is a part of Rankin Inlet North-Chesterfield Inlet.

Election results

1999 election

2003 by-election

2004 election

2008 election

References

External links
Website of the Legislative Assembly of Nunavut

Electoral districts of Kivalliq Region
1999 establishments in Nunavut
2013 disestablishments in Nunavut